The following radio stations broadcast on FM frequency 98.6 MHz:

New Zealand
The Hits in Auckland

Qatar 
 Malayalam Radio in Doha

Turkey

Radyo Türkü in Ankara
Radyo 3 in Antalya, Manavgat
Radyo 2 in Karaman

United Kingdom
 Hillz 98.6 FM in Coventry

References

Lists of radio stations by frequency